Madhavan may refer to:

People
 James Madhavan (died 1973), Fijian politician
 Kavya Madhavan (born 1985), Indian actress
 Mahesh Madhavan (born 1963/64), Indian businessman, CEO of Bacardi 
 N. S. Madhavan (born 1948), Indian writer
 O. Madhavan (1922–2005), Indian actor and director
 R. Madhavan (born 1970), Indian actor
 Rakesh Madhavan (born 1977), Malaysian cricketer
 S. Madhavan (1933-2018), Indian politician and Member of the Legislative Assembly of Tamil Nadu
 Santosh Madhavan (born 1960), Indian Godman under the name of Amritha Chaithanya
 Vijay Madhavan, Indian classical dancer

Other uses
 Madhavan, Iran, a village

See also
 Meesa Madhavan, a 2002 Malayalam film by Lal Jose
 Middle Class Madhavan, a 2001 Tamil film by T. P. Gajendran
Madhava (disambiguation)